Group A of the 2007 Fed Cup Americas Zone Group I was one of two pools in the Americas Zone Group I of the 2007 Fed Cup. Three teams competed in a round robin competition, with the top team and the bottom two teams proceeding to their respective sections of the play-offs: the top teams played for advancement to the World Group II Play-offs, while the bottom team faced potential relegation to Group II.

Brazil vs. Chile

Brazil vs. Mexico

Mexico vs. Chile

See also
Fed Cup structure

References

External links
 Fed Cup website

2007 Fed Cup Americas Zone